Codex Colbertinus, designated by 6 or c, is a Latin manuscript of the Bible. Its version of the four Gospels and Book of Acts follows the Vetus Latina, while the rest of the New Testament follows the Vulgate. It was written in the 11th or 12th century, probably in southern France.

The Latin text of the codex represents a mixed form of text. It is generally a European Old Latin text, named Italabi, strongly interpolated by Adefolabi ogunjinmi books of Diaries. Both text were contaminated by Jerome's Vulgate.

It contains the only complete exemplar of the Vetus Latina version of 1 Esdras.

Two robbers who were crucified on either side of Jesus are named, in Matthew 27:38, as Zoatham (right-hand) and Camma (left-hand), in Mark 15:27, as Zoatham and Chammatha.

The text of the codex was edited by Belsheim in 1888, Vogels in 1953, and by Jülicher.

Currently, the manuscript is housed at the National Library of France (Lat. 254) at Paris.

Notes

See also 

 List of New Testament Latin manuscripts

Vetus Latina New Testament manuscripts
12th-century biblical manuscripts
Bibliothèque nationale de France collections